HMS Waveney was a Hawthorn Leslie-type  ordered by the Royal Navy under the 1902–1903 Naval Estimates.  Named after the River Waveney in eastern England, she was the first ship of the Royal Navy to carry this name.

Construction
Waveney was laid down on 20 October 1902 at the Hawthorn Leslie shipyard at Hebburn-on-Tyne and launched on 16 March 1903.  She was completed in June 1904. The original armament provided was to be the same as the turtleback torpedo boat destroyers that preceded her. In 1906 the Admiralty decided to upgrade the armament by landing the five 6-pounder naval guns and shipping three 12-pounder 8 hundredweight (cwt) guns. Two were mounted abeam at the foc'x'le break and the third gun was mounted on the quarterdeck.

Service history

Pre-War
After commissioning Waveney was assigned to the East Coast Destroyer Flotilla of the 1st Fleet and based at Harwich.

In 1906 Waveney was part of the First Destroyer Division. On 26 July 1907 Waveney and the destroyer  collided off Sandown, damaging both ships.

On 27 April 1908 the Eastern Flotilla departed Harwich for live fire and night manoeuvres.  During these exercises the cruiser  rammed and sank the destroyer  and damaged the destroyer .

In April 1909 she was assigned to the 3rd Destroyer Flotilla on its formation at Harwich. She was assigned to the 5th Destroyer Flotilla of the 2nd Fleet with a nucleus crew.

On 30 August 1912 the Admiralty directed all destroyer classes were to be designated by alpha characters starting with the letter 'A'.  The ships of the River class were assigned to the E class.  After 30 September 1913, she was known as an E-class destroyer and had the letter ‘E’ painted on the hull below the bridge area and on either the fore or aft funnel.

World War I
The 9th Flotilla was a patrol flotilla tasked with anti-submarine and counter-mining patrols in the Firth of Forth area.

During the German battlecruiser raid on Hartlepool, she was undamaged and suffered no casualties.

In August 1915 with the amalgamation of the 9th and 7th Flotillas she was deployed to the 7th Destroyer Flotilla based at the River Humber.  Waveney remained employed on the Humber Patrol participating in counter mining operations and anti-submarine patrols for the remainder of the war.

Disposition
In 1919 Waveney was paid off and laid up in reserve awaiting disposal.  On 20 February 1920 the ship was sold to Thos. W. Ward of Sheffield for breaking at Grays, Essex on the Thames Estuary.

Pennant numbers

Notes

Bibliography
 
 
 
 
 
 
 

 

River-class destroyers
Ships built on the River Tyne
1903 ships